Queen Elizabeth II Court may refer to:

Queen Elizabeth II Court, Regina, the city block containing Regina City Hall in Regina, Saskatchewan
Queen Elizabeth II Courts of Law, Brisbane, a court building in Brisbane, Queensland, Australia
Queen Elizabeth II Great Court, the covered central quadrangle of the British Museum in London
Queen Elizabeth II Law Courts, Liverpool, in Derby Square, Liverpool